The Chicago Housing Authority (CHA) is a municipal corporation that oversees public housing within the city of Chicago. The agency's Board of Commissioners is appointed by the city's mayor, and has a budget independent from that of the city of Chicago. CHA is the largest rental landlord in Chicago, with more than 50,000 households. CHA owns over 21,000 apartments (9,200 units reserved for seniors and over 11,400 units in family and other housing types). It also oversees the administration of 37,000 Section 8 vouchers. The current acting CEO of the Chicago Housing Authority is Tracey Scott.

History
The CHA was created in 1937 to own and operate housing built by the federal government's Public Works Administration. In addition to providing affordable housing for low-income families and combating blight, it also provided housing for industry workers during World War II and returning veterans after the war. By 1960, it was the largest landlord in Chicago. In 1965, a group of residents sued the CHA for racial discrimination. After the landmark court decision Gautreaux v. Chicago Housing Authority (see below), the CHA was placed in receivership, which would last for more than 20 years. Things continued to deteriorate for the agency and its residents, and by the 1980s, the high concentrations of poverty and neglected infrastructure were severe. The Chicago Housing Authority Police Department was created in 1989 to provide dedicated policing for what had become one of the most impoverished and crime-ridden housing developments in the country, and was dissolved only ten years later. The situation was so dire that the entire CHA board of commissioners resigned in 1995, effectively handing over control of the agency to Housing and Urban Development. After an extensive overhaul, management of the CHA was returned to a new board of commissioners, including three residents appointed by resident groups, in 1999. The previously ordered receivership ended in 2010.

Plan for Transformation/Plan Forward
In 2000, the CHA began its Plan For Transformation, which called for the demolition of all of its gallery high-rise buildings and proposed a renovated housing portfolio totaling 25,000 units. In April 2013, CHA created Plan Forward, the next phase of redeveloping public housing in Chicago. The plan includes the rehabilitation of other scattered-site, senior, and lower-density properties; construction of mixed-income housing; increasing economic sales around CHA developments; and providing educational and job training to residents with Section 8 vouchers. The Plan for Transformation has also been plagued with problems. While demolition began almost immediately, CHA was slow to develop mixed-income units or provide Section 8 vouchers as planned. In 2015, the Secretary of Housing and Urban Development criticized the Chicago Housing Authority for accumulating a cash reserve of $440 million at a time when more than a quarter million people were on the agency's waiting list for affordable housing, and a large number of units (16%) remained vacant. In March 2017, only 8% of the 17,000 demolished households had been replaced with mixed-income units. Many lots remain vacant decades after demolition, and the CHA has been selling, leasing, or trading land in gentrifying neighborhoods to other government agencies and the private sector for less than market value. Land owned by the CHA has been used to build two Target stores, a private tennis complex, and government facilities at a time when over 30,000 people are awaiting housing assistance from the CHA.  One Chicago resident, Jeanette Taylor, applied for housing assistance as a single mother in 1993 and received an approval letter almost thirty years later in 2022.

More than 20 years after the initial plan was announced, Chicago Mayor Lori Lightfoot announced in June 2021 that finishing the redevelopment of Cabrini-Green alone will take at least another 12 years and could total upwards of $1 billion.

Demographics 
From its beginning until the late-1950s, most families that lived in Chicago housing projects were Italian immigrants. By the mid-1970s, 65% of the agency's housing projects were made up of African Americans. In 1975, a study showed that traditional mother and father families in CHA housing projects were almost non-existent and 93% of the households were headed by single females. In 2010, the head of households demographics were 88% African American and 12% White. The population of children in CHA decreased from 50% in 2000 to 35% by 2010. Today on average, a Chicago public housing development is made up of: 69% African-American, 27% Latino, and 4% White and Other.

List of Chief Executive Officers

Lawsuits

Gautreaux v. Chicago Housing Authority
In 1966, Dorothy Gautreaux and other CHA residents brought a suit against the CHA in Gautreaux v. Chicago Housing Authority. The suit charged racial discrimination by the housing authority for concentrating 10,000 public housing units in isolated Black neighborhoods. It claimed that the CHA and Housing and Urban Development (HUD) had violated the U.S. Constitution and the 1964 Civil Rights Act. It was a long-running case that in 1987 resulted in HUD taking over the CHA for over 20 years and the formation of the Gautreaux Project in which public housing families were relocated to the suburbs. The lawsuit was noted as the nation's first major public housing desegregation lawsuit.

Other lawsuits
In May 2013, The Cabrini–Green Local Advisory Council and former residents of the Cabrini–Green Homes sued the housing authority for reneging on promises for the residents to return the neighborhood after redevelopment. The suit claimed that the housing authority at the time had only renovated a quarter of the remaining row-houses, making only a small percentage of them public housing.

In September 2015, four residents sued the housing authority over utility allowances. Residents claimed the CHA overcharged them for rent and didn't credit them for utility costs.

Developments

Housing projects

Other housing
In addition to the traditional housing projects, CHA has 51 senior housing developments, 61 scattered site housing and 15 mixed-income housing developments.

Notable residents

 R. Kelly – Ida B. Wells Homes
 Mr. T – Robert Taylor Homes
 Maurice Cheeks – Robert Taylor Homes
 Curtis Mayfield – Cabrini–Green Homes
 Eric Monte – Cabrini–Green Homes
 Jerry Butler – Cabrini–Green Homes
 Kirby Puckett – Robert Taylor Homes
 Deval Patrick – Robert Taylor Homes
 Marvin Smith – Robert Taylor Homes
 Lou Rawls – Ida B. Wells Homes

See also 

 Hills v. Gautreaux, a 1976 Supreme Court case
 Chicago Housing Authority Police Department
 Marshall Field Garden Apartments

References

Further reading 
 Dizikes, Peter, "Chicago hope: Ambitious attempt to help the city’s poor by moving them out of troubled housing projects is having mixed results, MIT study finds", MIT News, MIT News Office, March 3, 2011.
 Blueprint for Disaster: The Unraveling of Chicago Public Housing, a 2009 book by D. Bradford Hunt.
 "Understanding Chicago's High-Rise Public Housing Disaster", in Chicago Architecture: Histories, Revisions, and Alternatives, edited by Charles Waldheim and Katerina Reudi Ray (University of Chicago Press, 2005).
 "How Did Public Housing Survive the 1950s?", Journal of Policy History, 17:2, Spring 2005, 193–216.

External links
 

Government of Chicago
 
1937 establishments in Illinois